Marine Barracks may refer to:

Marine Barracks Brooklyn, New York at the Brooklyn Navy Yard
Marine Barracks Boston, Massachusetts at the Boston Navy Yard
Marine Barracks (Philadelphia, Pennsylvania), National Register of Historic Places listings in Philadelphia County, Pennsylvania
Marine Barracks Mare Island, California at the Mare Island Naval Shipyard
Marine Barracks, Naval Air Station Midway on Midway Island
Marine Barracks, Washington, D.C., listed on the National Register of Historic Places in Washington, D.C. as the U.S. Marine Corps Barracks and Commandant's House
Marine Corps Base Quantico, originally called Marine Barracks

See also
1983 Beirut barracks bombing, an attack on United States Marine Corps barracks buildings
Barracks
Marines